Halper is a variation of the Jewish surname Heilprin and may refer to:

 Albert Halper (1904–1984), writer
 Barry Halper (1939–2005), collector of baseball memorabilia 
 Benzion Halper (1884–1924), Lithuanian-American Hebraist and Arabist 
 Daniel Halper, author
 Donna Halper (born 1947), Boston-based historian and radio consultant 
 Jeff Halper (born 1946), former professor of anthropology at Ben-Gurion University, Israel
 Jürgen Halper (born 1974), Austrian football manager
 Katie Halper, American writer and comedian
 Leivick Halper (1888–1962), Yiddish language writer
 Mark Robert Halper (born 1965), photographer
 Stefan Halper (born 1944), American foreign policy scholar

See also
 Santos L. Halper, misspelled version of Santa's Little Helper, fictional dog from The Simpsons in the episode "The Canine Mutiny"

Jewish surnames
Yiddish-language surnames